Ryeford is a rural locality in the Toowoomba Region, Queensland, Australia. In the  Ryeford had a population of 57 people.

Geography 
Kings Creek forms the southern and eastern boundary of the locality.

History 
Ryeford State School opened on 8 November 1937. The school celebrated its 50th anniversary with a monument unveiled on 7 November 1987 by Lin Powell, Queensland Minister of Education.

In the  Ryeford had a population of 57 people.

Education 
Ryeford State School was a government co-educational primary (P-6) school at 968 Clifton Leyburn Road. It opened on 8 November 1937 and permanently closed on 12 December 2016. In 2016, the school had no children enrolled, having had only 2 children in 2015.

References

Further reading 
 

Toowoomba Region
Localities in Queensland